Alexandra Nicoleta Anghel (born 28 June 1997) is a Romanian freestyle wrestler. She won one of the bronze medals in the 72kg event at the 2022 World Wrestling Championships held in Belgrade, Serbia. She also won one of the bronze medals in the 72 kg event at the 2018 European Wrestling Championships held in Kaspiysk, Russia.

Career 

In 2019, she lost the bronze medal match in the 72 kg event at the European Wrestling Championships held in Bucharest, Romania. In the same year, she also competed in the 72 kg event at the 2019 World Wrestling Championships where she lost her first match against Natalia Vorobieva. In the repechage she was eliminated from the competition by Masako Furuichi of Japan.

In February 2022, she won one of the bronze medals in the 72 kg event at the Yasar Dogu Tournament held in Istanbul, Turkey. In April 2022, she lost her bronze medal match in the 72 kg event at the European Wrestling Championships held in Budapest, Hungary. A few months later, she won the bronze medal in her event at the Matteo Pellicone Ranking Series 2022 held in Rome, Italy. She won one of the bronze medals in the 72kg event at the 2022 World Wrestling Championships held in Belgrade, Serbia.

Achievements

References

External links 
 

Living people
1997 births
Place of birth missing (living people)
Romanian female sport wrestlers
World Wrestling Championships medalists
European Wrestling Championships medalists
Wrestlers at the 2019 European Games
European Games competitors for Romania
21st-century Romanian women